Florentynów may refer to the following places:
Florentynów, Pabianice County in Łódź Voivodeship (central Poland)
Florentynów, Radomsko County in Łódź Voivodeship (central Poland)
Florentynów, Zgierz County in Łódź Voivodeship (central Poland)